Anoecea trigonophora is a moth in the family Xyloryctidae, and the only species in the genus Anoecea. It was described by Alexey Diakonoff in 1951 and is found in Burma.

References

Xyloryctidae
Monotypic moth genera
Moths of Asia
Xyloryctidae genera